Frankie Lam Man-lung (born 19 December 1967) is a Hong Kong actor. He entered a singing contest and subsequently, signed a contract with TVB. He left TVB in 2011 to join HKTV.

Lam married Hong Kong actress Kenix Kwok on 10 March 2004. Their first child, daughter Tania Lam Tin-yeuk, was born on 14 January 2010.

On May 18, 2015, Lam announced he will join and invest in Global Saga, a film company established by Tony Wong and Rachel Lam. The first film from the company, The Merger was released in 2015.

On 23 December 2019, Lam was appointed to be Vice President of Asia Television Limited.

Filmography

Television series

Film
Tour of Revenge (1989)
Running on Empty (1991)
Behind the Mask (1993)
Tears and Triumph (1994)
Now You See Me Now You Don't (1994)
The Dragon Chronicles - The Maidens (1994)
From The Same Family (1995)
Born to be Wild (1995 Hong Kong film) (1995)
Lethal Match (1996)
The Fatalist (1996)
Godmother of Monkok (1997)
To Kiss is Fatal (1998)
The First Stone (2013)
The Merger (2015)
Cold War 2 (2016)

References

External links
 
 Frankie Lam on Sina Weibo
Spcnet Profile

1967 births
Living people
People from Panyu District
Hong Kong male television actors
TVB actors
Hong Kong male film actors
Asia Television
20th-century Hong Kong male actors
21st-century Hong Kong male actors